A Brilliant Genocide is a 2016 documentary film produced by Atlantic Star Productions. The purpose of the film is to reveal atrocities committed against the Acholi people by the Government of Uganda, and its President Yoweri Museveni, under the guise of crushing a rebellion by Joseph Kony's Lord's Resistance Army (LRA). The film is a counterpoint to the 2012 documentary short film Kony 2012. It was directed by Ebony Butler.

It's brings an insight of the forgotten war, that turned out to be one of the most neglected human crisis of the modern times as described by Jan Egland.

The film brings out a dimension and perspective that has not always been with most of the film's that have entirely relied on official discourses.

Film festival selection
Palm Beach International Film Festival (7 April 2016, Nominated—Best Feature Documentary)
LA Women's International Film Festival (27 March 2016, Won—Best Feature Documentary)
Hollywood International Independent Documentary Awards (12 March 2016, Won—Best Feature Documentary)
DC Independent Film Festival (11 March 2016, world premiere)

See also
Kony 2012

References

External links
 
 

2016 films
Australian documentary films
Documentary films about child abuse
Documentary films about human rights
Documentary films about war
Documentary films about Uganda
Documentary films about child soldiers
Documentary films about African politics
Lord's Resistance Army